The following lists events that happened during 1990 in the Democratic Republic of São Tomé and Príncipe.

Incumbents
President: Leonel Mário d'Alva (acting)
Prime Minister: Celestino Rocha da Costa

Events
May: politician Miguel Trovoada returned to São Tomé and Príncipe from exile in France
22 August: A Constitutional referendum took place, it became a multi-party democracy
October: at the MLSTP party Congress, Carlos Graça was appointed as the new Secretary-General of the party. In addition, the party's name was amended to the Movement for the Liberation of São Tomé and Príncipe/Social Democratic Party (MLSTP/PSD).
4 November: the Democratic Convergence Party – Reflection Group (PCD-CR) was founded

Sports
GD Os Operários won the São Tomé and Príncipe Football Championship

References

 
Years of the 20th century in São Tomé and Príncipe
1990s in São Tomé and Príncipe
São Tomé and Príncipe
São Tomé and Príncipe